Pylon Reenactment Society  is an American rock band from Athens, Georgia.

Since 2014, Vanessa Briscoe Hay, who was the singer of Pylon, has fronted the Pylon Reenactment Society, aka PRS, a band featuring members of more recent Athens bands like The Glands and Casper & the Cookies who perform the music of Pylon and now are writing and recording original material. 

In a 2016 Portland Mercury interview, Hay said, "It's been inspirational, if that's the right word, to be able to play this music again. I really don't want people to forget Pylon. These are different people and we are re-enacting this experience, so it's not exactly Pylon, but it's fresh and done in the same spirit". 

In October 2017, Pylon Reenactment Society self-released an EP that was initially recorded on December 11, 2016 for broadcast in Los Angeles, California for DJ Michael Stock's Part Time Punks KXLU show, titled Part Time Punks Session. 

Hay was named one of the “25 Best Frontwomen of All Time” by Paste Magazine in March 2018. 

Pylon Reenactment Society released a 7-inch single with two brand-new songs, “Messenger” backed with “Cliff Notes” in late November 2018. Critic Falling James noted the new release in his LA Times article for upcoming shows in the LA area: “The A-side is an intriguing track as Hay purrs enigmatically over a rubbery bass line and sliced-up guitar accents, emphasizing that the charismatic vocalist's worldview is just as (post)modern as ever.” 

On May 28, 2019, Pylon Reenactment Society performed at Primavera Sound 2019 in Barcelona, Spain upon a brand new stage sponsored by Heineken just for cult artists.

Discography

Video
 Beep (2017), Pylon Reenactment Society, from Vinyl 12” Ep Part Time Punks Session, PRS for Chunklet Industries, from unreleased documentary “Athens, GA...30 Years On” directed by Bill Cody,edited by Tony Brazier.
 Messenger (2018), Pylon Reenactment Society, from Vinyl 7 inch Single    Messenger / Cliff Notes, PRS for Chunklet Industries, directed by Tony Brazier.

EPs & Singles 
 Part Time Punks Session Vinyl 6 song 12" EP  (PRS, October 20, 2017) PRS001 with Chunklet Industries.
 Messenger / Cliff Notes Vinyl 7” Single (PRS, November 30, 2018) PRS002 with Chunklet Industries.

References

Indie rock musical groups from Georgia (U.S. state)
Alternative rock groups from Georgia (U.S. state)
Musical groups from Athens, Georgia
Musical groups established in 2014
2014 establishments in Georgia (U.S. state)